N62 may refer to:

Roads 
 N62 road (Ireland)
 Western Scheldt Tunnel, in the Netherlands
 N62 highway, in the Philippines
 Nebraska Highway 62, in the United States

Other uses 
 N62 (Long Island bus)
 BMW N62, an automobile engine
 , a submarine of the Royal Navy